Coccycua is a small genus  of birds in the cuckoo family, Cuculidae. Its three species are found in the tropical Americas.

Formerly, they were divided among in Coccyzus (two species) and Piaya (one species), or the former were assigned to Micrococcyx and only the latter to Coccycua. Following the discovery that they form a monophyletic lineage equidistant to both related genera, Coccycua has been revalidated.

Species
The species are:

Synonyms
The genus name Coccycua has often been believed to be a misspelling, and various emendations have been proposed. However, the name as originally written is valid. The junior synonyms are:
 Coccicua Lesson, 1837 (unjustified emendation)
 Coccygua Fitzinger, 1856 (unjustified emendation)
 Coccyzaea Hartlaub, 1842 (unjustified emendation)
 Coccyzusa Cabanis & Heine, [1863] (unjustified emendation)
 Micrococcyx Ridgway, 1912

 
Bird genera

Taxa named by René Lesson